Charles James Faulkner (September 21, 1847January 13, 1929) was a United States senator from West Virginia.

Early life 
Born on the family estate, "Boydville," near Martinsburg, Virginia (now West Virginia). His father was Charles James Faulkner Sr., a U.S. Representative from Virginia and West Virginia and U.S. Minister to France.

He accompanied his father to France 1859; he attended school in Paris and Switzerland. He returned to the United States in 1861, and during the Civil War entered the Virginia Military Institute at Lexington in 1862. He served with the cadets in the Battle of New Market.

After the war, he attended the law department of the University of Virginia at Charlottesville, graduating in 1868. At the University of Virginia, he was member of St. Anthony Hall.

Career 
He was admitted to the bar in 1868 and commenced practice in Martinsburg.

In 1887, Faulkner was elected as a Democratic to the U.S. Senate; he was reelected in 1893 and served from March 4, 1887, to March 3, 1899. While in the Senate, he was chairman of the Committee on Territories (Fifty-third Congress). In 1898 he was appointed a member of the International Joint High Commission of the United States and Great Britain.

He retired from public life and devoted his time to the practice of law in Martinsburg and Washington, D.C., and to the management of his agricultural interests.

Personal 
In 1922, he served as first president of the Opequon Golf Club.

Faulkner died at the Boydville family estate in 1929; interment was in the Old Norbourne Cemetery, Martinsburg.

References
Notes

Sources

External links
The West Virginia & Regional History Center at West Virginia University houses the papers of Charles James Faulkner in four collections, A&M 912 A&M 934, A&M 993, and A&M 1681

1847 births
1929 deaths
19th-century American lawyers
20th-century American lawyers
Military personnel from West Virginia
Confederate States Army soldiers
Democratic Party United States senators from West Virginia
New Market cadets
Politicians from Martinsburg, West Virginia
People of West Virginia in the American Civil War
University of Virginia School of Law alumni
Virginia Military Institute alumni
West Virginia Democrats
Boyd family of Virginia and West Virginia
Lawyers from Martinsburg, West Virginia